Bolshoy Dvor is a rural locality (a village) in ust-Alexeyevskoye Rural Settlement, Velikoustyugsky District, Vologda Oblast, Russia. The population was 32 as of 2002.

Geography 
The distance to Veliky Ustyug is 60 km, to Ust-Alexeyevo is 8 km. Opalevo is the nearest rural locality.

References 

Rural localities in Velikoustyugsky District